YMCA Cricket Club is a cricket club in Dublin, Ireland, playing in Division 1 of the Leinster Senior League.

The club was established in 1890 and acquired its current grounds at Claremont Road in 1911. Senior status was achieved in 1934 and the club won the Leinster Senior League for the first time in 1955.

Former Irish internationals include Alan Lewis, Angus Dunlop, Jonathan Garth, Mark Nulty, Stewart M. Taylor, Keith Bailey, Ian Lewis, Roderick Gill, Reginald Lyons, Reinhardt Strydom, Albert van der Merwe and Trent Johnston.

Honours
Leinster Senior League: 6
1955, 1965, 1986, 1990, 1993, 2014
Leinster Senior League Cup: 12
1984, 1986, 1987, 1988, 1990, 1991, 1994, 2001, 2002, 2013, 2016, 2020

References

External links
Club web site

Cricket clubs established in 1890
Cricket clubs in County Dublin
Leinster Senior League (cricket) teams
1890 establishments in Ireland
Cricket